Hypsopygia biarealis is a species of snout moth in the genus Hypsopygia. It was described by Aristide Caradja in 1925. It is found in China.

References

Moths described in 1925
Pyralini
Taxa named by Aristide Caradja